Gilman M. Dame was an American politician from Michigan who served as the chairman of the Michigan Republican Party from 1914 to 1916. Dame resided in Northport, Leelanau County, Michigan.

References 

Michigan Republican Party chairs
Michigan Republicans
Year of birth missing
Year of death missing